Ilmurzino (İlmırźa) is a rural locality (a village) in Starokamyshlinsky Selsoviet, Kushnarenkovsky District, Bashkortostan, Russia. The population was 297 as of 2010. There are 9 streets.

Geography 
Ilmurzino is located 42 km southeast of Kushnarenkovo (the district's administrative centre) by road. Starye Kamyshly is the nearest rural locality.

References 

Rural localities in Kushnarenkovsky District